XHTUG-FM is a radio station on 103.5 FM in Tuxtla Gutiérrez, Chiapas, Mexico. The station is owned by Grupo Radiorama and is known as Éxtasis Digital with an adult contemporary format.

History

XHTUG-AM 950 received its concession on November 28, 1988. It was owned by Radiorama subsidiary Espectáculo Auditivo, S.A. XHTUG migrated to FM in 2010.

As part of wholesale format and operator changes at Radiorama Chiapas in August 2019, XHTUG dropped Estereo Joven to become a pop station. On 21 September 2020, the station changed formats again, now using adult contemporary format Éxtasis Digital.

In December 2022, XHTUG took on the Romántica format from XHUE-FM 99.3, which then left the air.

References

Radio stations in Chiapas
Radio stations established in 1988